Y. Eswara Reddy (1915 – 3 August 1986) was an Indian politician who was leader of Communist Party of India and was member of 5th Lok Sabha from Kadapa (Lok Sabha constituency) in the state of Andhra Pradesh.

Reddy was born at Village Peddapasapula, Kadapa district in 1915. He was elected to 1st, 3rd and 4th Lok Sabha from Kadapa. Reddy died in Kadapa on 3 August 1986, at the age of 71.

References

1915 births
1986 deaths
People from Kadapa district
India MPs 1962–1967
India MPs 1967–1970
India MPs 1971–1977
India MPs 1952–1957
Andhra Pradesh politicians
Lok Sabha members from Andhra Pradesh
Communist Party of India politicians from Andhra Pradesh